The 1927 BYU Cougars football team was an American football team that represented Brigham Young University (BYU) as a member of the Rocky Mountain Conference (RMC) during the 1927 college football season. In their third and final season under head coach Charles J. Hart, the Cougars compiled an overall record of 2–4–1 with a mark of 2–4 in conference play, finished eighth in the RMC, and were outscored by a total of 118 to 105.

Schedule

References

BYU
BYU Cougars football seasons
BYU Cougars football